The General Commission of German Trade Unions was an umbrella body for German trade unions during the German Empire, from the end of the Anti-Socialist Laws in 1890 up to 1919. In 1919, a successor organisation was named the Allgemeiner Deutscher Gewerkschaftsbund, and then in 1949, the current Deutscher Gewerkschaftsbund was formed.

History
In January 1890, the Reichstag refused to extend the Anti-Socialist Laws which had prohibited socialist political parties and trade unions.  Despite this, many of those trade unions which did exist, the Free Trade Unions, had come to work closely with the Social Democratic Party of Germany (SPD).

Large celebrations marked May Day in 1890. In Hamburg, employers locked out workers who took the day off.  In response, the various unions representing metal and engineering workers called for a union conference, to look at the implications of this defeat.  On 16 and 17 November, trade union leaders met in Berlin, and agreed to found the General Commission of German Trade Unions, under the leadership of Carl Legien.

The new organisation brought together unions representing a total of 290,000 members.  It initially focused on activities which affiliates were unable or unwilling to undertake.  On 1 January 1891, it launched a journal, Correspondenzblatt der Generalkommission, to promote membership recruitment and support.  Initially, the new organisation struggled, and affiliated membership fell from 215,000 in 1892.

In March 1892, the commission called a congress in Halberstadt, at which a majority agreed to support the formation of national, centralised unions.  While this approach was favoured by the existing central unions, and by smaller, craft unions, it was strongly opposed by local unions.  These tended to be associated with the left-wing of the SPD, and argued unsuccessfully for the unions to play a major political role.

The commission promoted some standardisation among its members, encouraging them to set up insurance funds to cover strikes, travel, health, and death.  It argued that unions must actively recruit women as members, although the process proved slow.  It also argued for increases in membership fees, to strengthen the unions, and this led unions to take on more employees - numbers rising from 269 in 1900, to 2,867 in 1914.  While it remained neutral on whether craft unions should merge to form industrial unions, there was a strong tendency towards mergers, with the number of affiliates falling from 70 in 1890, to 46 in 1914, even as overall affiliated membership increased rapidly.  By 1904, affiliated membership had reached 1,100,000, and in 1914, it hit 2,500,000.

By the second half of the 1890s, Legien was arguing that the unions were no longer a recruitment school for the SPD, but were mass industrial organisations, of whom only a minority of members would become political activists.  In 1905, the commission voted against the use of general strikes for political end, against the opposition of the SPD.  While the party leadership sought to smooth over the difference in opinion, Rosa Luxemburg vocally opposed the lack of political activity among the trade unions, and even Karl Kautsky argued that there were limits to what trade unions could achieve without undertaking political activity.  The commission maintained its position, writing "Contributions to the Appreciation of the Work of the German Trade Unions" in response.

The commission supported German involvement in World War I, arguing for a moratorium on political debate and industrial action.  As the war continued, popular support for it fell, along with union membership.  When the Independent Social Democratic Party split away from the SPD, in opposition to war loans, the commission remained loyal to the SPD, but began calling more clearly for political and social reforms.  In December 1918, with the SPD in power, the commission participated in founding the Central Working Group for Industrial and Commercial Employers and Employees in Germany.  The unions were legally recognised as the representatives of the workers, but were compelled to negotiate with employers through formal structures.

In November 1919, the commission held its tenth congress, and voted to reform as the General German Trade Union Federation.

Affiliates
The following unions were affiliated from 1904 onwards:

See also
German labour law

References

Defunct trade unions of Germany
1890 establishments in Germany
1919 disestablishments in Germany
Trade unions established in 1890
Trade unions disestablished in 1919
National trade union centers of Germany